Eldoret is a principal town in the Rift Valley region of Kenya and serves as the capital of Uasin Gishu County. The town was referred to by white settlers as Farm 64 and colloquially by locals as 'Sisibo'. As per the 2019 Kenya Population and Housing Census, Eldoret is the fifth most populated urban area in the country after Nairobi, Mombasa, Nakuru and Ruiru. The population was 289,380 in the 2009 Census, and it is currently the fastest growing town in Kenya with 475,716 people according to 2019 National Census. Eldoret was on course to be named Kenya's fourth city, but was edged out by Nakuru in 2021.

Etymology

The name "Eldoret" is based on the Maasai word "eldore" meaning "stony river"; a reference to the bed of the Sosiani River (a tributary of the Nile), that runs through the city.

History
Eldoret and the plateau around it had been occupied by the Sirikwa for several centuries prior to the era of Maasai ascendancy. Innovation in weaponry was introduced by the Maasai era of the late 18th and 19th centuries. With new weapons and forms of governance, they swept down from their original homelands in the north, closer to Lake Turkana, down to their present homelands south of Kenya. The Maasai clan that took over the Plateau were known as the Ilwasin Kishu, after whom it is presently named.

In August 1908, fifty-eight families of displaced Afrikaners left Nakuru for the Uasin Gishu plateau after a journey from South Africa by sea and by rail from Mombasa. Led by Jan van Rensburg, they traveled using wagons that would often get stuck  in mud, finally arriving at Sergoit Hill  on 22 October of that year. Jan Ernest Kruger would later own the  Sergoit farm, now owned by Sergoit Golf and Wildlife resort.

Each family built a shack, put up fences, in-spanned oxen to simple ploughs and turned the first furrows. They sowed wheat, maize and vegetables. These actions laid the foundation for the transformation of the Plateau into a prosperous agricultural region.

The farms were later officially registered and each was given a number.

Willy van Aardt owned the farm. The Central Lounge in Eldoret is all that remains of Willy's farm.

The official town site started in 1910 with the development of a Post Office at "Sisibo". This was followed shortly after by the arrival of 60 more Afrikaner families in 1911. The governor decided to establish an administrative centre in the area in 1912 and thus the Post Office was renamed from "64" to a new official town name: "Eldoret". Becoming an administrative centre caused an enormous increase in trade within the prospective city. A bank and several shops were built.

The Uganda Railway extension, from Kibigori toward Uganda, reached Eldoret in 1924, starting a new era of prosperity and growth. In 1928, a piped water supply from the Sosiani River was installed. In 1933, the East African Power and Lighting Company installed an electricity generator plant. By that time, Eldoret had a small airport, and low-cost rental housing had been constructed.

In the 1950s the town was literally divided into two, along the main street (now Uganda Road), with the Afrikaans on the north and the British on the south. The former took their children to Highland School, (now Moi Girls High School) and the latter, to Hill School. Recreation was also along the divide – 'Brits' used the Lincoln Hotel and the Race-Course near the now "Chinese Area" while the Afrikaans converged at the Wagon Wheel for recreation.

Daniel Arap Moi was born in the neighboring Baringo District, and under his presidency, the town was developed further. The country's second institution of higher learning, Moi University, was established by the government in 1984 and the third international airport was subsequently constructed, significantly boosting the fortunes of the town.

By 1987, only two Afrikaner households remained in Eldoret, with the rest having moved back to South Africa in the late 1950s and early 1960s, in the aftermath of the Mau Mau rebellion and in anticipation of independence.

The city was significantly impacted by the 2007–2008 Kenyan crisis when violence gripped Kenya in the aftermath of controversial general elections. On 1 January 2008,  a mob attacked and set fire to a church located near burnt forest town, a satellite town of Eldoret. Hundreds of people had taken refuge during Kenyan massacres. As a result, about forty to eighty people, mostly Kikuyu, were burnt to death.

William Ruto the current President of the Republic of Kenya was born in Kamagut Ward of Turbo Constituency that straddles Eldoret town. He has previously represented Eldoret North Constituency in parliament.

Climate 

Eldoret has a subtropical highland climate (Köppen climate classification Cfb). The temperatures fall significantly at night, and in the cold season (May–August) it is regularly in the single digits Celsius.

Population

Local governance
Eldoret is governed by the County Government of Uasin Gishu  which manages all the city affairs. The city is divided into thirteen wards. Six of them (Huruma, Kamukunji, Kapyemit, Kidiwa/Kapsuswa, and Stadium/Industrial, Market) are in Eldoret North Constituency, Three (Hospital, Kapsoya and Kimumu/Sergoit) are in Eldoret East Constituency, and the remaining four (Kipkenyo, Langas, Pioneer/Elgon View and Race Course) are part of Eldoret South Constituency. All of these three constituencies have more wards within other local authorities than Eldoret municipality.

Suburbs
Eldoret has a number of estates. Estates vary in that some are posh and others are residents of the middle-class community. Almost every estate has its own identity. Some of the estates include Elgon View, Langas, Kapseret, Huruma, Kapsoya, Shauri, Kipkorgot, Kahoya, West Indies, West, Kipkaren, Kimumu, Jerusalem, Annex, Mwanzo, Action, Mailinne, Pioneer, Outspan, Kiplombe, Kamkunji, Samar, Silas, Kenya Service, Cheplaskei, Chinese, Road Block, Peris, Junction, Munyaka, Hillside, Eldoville, Juniorate among many others.

Economy

Eldoret is surrounded by prime agricultural lands and acts as a trading centre for Uasin Gishu's economy which is driven by large-scale grain farming, dairy and horticultural farming. The town is also a local manufacturing hub with a number of nationally recognised manufacturing concerns, including Raiplywoods, Rupa Textiles, Kenya Pipeline Company, Kenya Co-operative Creameries as well as corn, wheat and pyrethrum factories all within the town.

The city is home to a large market and is known for the Doinyo Lessos cheese factory, Moi University and Eldoret International Airport. The runners from Eldoret have also contributed significantly to the economy of Eldoret town, primarily investing in small businesses and real estate, from their winnings in races all over the world. Moses Kiptanui is a stake holder in one of the largest buildings Komora that houses a large supermarket chain and many offices.
 
Notable professional firms include Nyairo and Company, the oldest law firm in the city, founded by Alfred Momanyi Nyairo in the sixties. Other law firms include Wabomba Masinde and Associates advocates, Gumbo and Associate Advocates, Mburu Maina & Company Advocates, Nyaundi Tuiyott & Company Advocates, Kalya & Company Advocates, Chebii and Company Advocates and Gicheru & Company Advocates.

Industries

Textiles
The town has a vibrant textile industry that is led by Ken Knit (Kenya). It is the first, fully integrated textile manufacturing company in East and Central Africa and has been based in Eldoret for close to 50 years. It is Kenya's leading manufacturer of wool products and with a workforce of 2,000, is presently the largest textile related employer in the North-Rift.

Another notable textile firm is Rivatex EA which was opened in 1975 by then Vice President, Daniel Toroitich arap Moi as Rift Valley Textiles (Rivatex), a parastatal that was the first Kenyan textile mill to operate computerized mills. It quickly became a success, achieving profitability within three years while employing 400 people and consuming 3,000 tons of cotton a year at its peak. By the late 1990s, the liberalization of Kenya's market which led to massive imports of cheap used clothing coupled with mismanagement led to the decline of the country's textile industry. Rivatex in Eldoret was placed under receivership in 1998 and finally shut its doors in 2000.

The town of Eldoret, through Moi University and its subsidiary firm Rivatex, has played a leading role in the revival of the Kenyan textile industry.

The defunct Rivatex was purchased from the Government of Kenya in 2007 by Moi University as a facility for research, product development, extension and production. The university identified the high cost of imported dyes as a factor affecting profitability. This was resolved in 2008, when Prof Richard Mibey, invented the Tami Dye, a natural dye made from Mexican Marigold which was previously considered a weed in the surrounding regions. The university holds the patent to this dye.

Being able to produce affordable dye in Kenya has been a key contributing factor to the revival of Rivatex East Africa and the wider Kenyan textile industry. The university won a $60 million grant from the World Bank to carry out a face-lift as a result of the work on the Tami Dye. It also secured a pledged investment of $40 million from the Indian Government.

Digital assembly
In mid-2019, Rivatex, reopened following major renovations and restructuring. As part of this effort, it opened a Digital Assembly Plant with the capacity to produce laptops, tablets, electric meters, smartphones and other digital devices.

Military
The city is host to the Moi Barracks for the Kenya Defence Forces. The barracks has a memorial for Kenyan soldiers killed in battle in Somalia. The city is also home to the Kenya Ordnance Factories Corporation since 1997, a military installation that is the only manufacturer of small arms and ammunition in the region. Its customers include the Kenya Police, Wildlife Service, the Army, licensed dealers and carriers as well as friendly governments.

Fertilizer
The Toyota Tsusho Corporation built Kenya's first full scale fertilizer blending factory at Ngeria on the outskirts of Eldoret. The $15 million plant has the capacity to produce 150,000 tonnes per year which is 25% of Kenya's 600,000 annual requirement.

Services

ICT
In early 2019, Safaricom, Kenya's largest mobile network operator, set up its second largest call centre, and its first outside Nairobi, in Eldoret town. The Kshs 900 million facility provides employment to 800 individuals of whom 300 are paid interns from local universities.

The town is also home to the MGW site, located at Kapsoya, the first of Safaricom's data centre in the North Rift, set up in 2015.

Tourism
Eldoret has traditionally not been known as a tourist destination and does not have much to differentiate it from Kenya's other highland centres. Being Kenya's fifth-largest city however, it is a great deal bigger and serves as a base for touring the North-Rift circuit. The city has a decent variety of accommodation options, notably the Sirikwa Hotel, Poa Place and the ultra-modern Boma Inn as well as enough night-life options to interest one for an evening or two.

Surrounding region

The city and surrounding regions has also lately grown into a sports tourism destination thanks to a number of resident, renowned world runners and a high-altitude that makes the local area suitable for athletics training.

Notable attractions within easy distance of Eldoret include the Nandi Hills area to the south, home of the Nandi, the fiercest early opponents to British rule. It is also the home of the Chemosit, a crypto-beast that is said to devour human brains. 

To the north lies the town of Iten, capital of Elgeyo Marakwet county and the world's foremost source of elite-middle and long distance runners. It is a popular destination for foreigners looking to hone their athletics talent and time at its high altitude training centres form part of a number of elite athletes training regimens. Notably, altitude training here was a key element of Mo farah's preparations before his 5000m and 10000m gold medals at London 2012 and World Championships 2013.

Elgeyo Marakwet is also increasingly gaining a global reputation as a paragliding destination. It has become the place to go to fly  out-and-returns in January with world records across both distances having been set in the Kerio Valley in 2013 and 2014 respectively.

Retail
The city is home to many retail stores, supermarket chains and various malls, including Rupa Mall and Zion Mall. The city hosts various MSMEs located in various notable buildings such as Komora Centre, Zul Arcade, 64 Arcade, Kibogy Arcade, Tarita Centre, Jumbo House, Sugarland, Barngetuny, The Anchor and Kalyet City Mall.

Entertainment
Eldoret has a vibrant nightlife with many clubs found in the city centre such as Club Timba, Tamasha, TMT, Area 51, Club 411, Signature Club, Babel Club and the more upmarket Klique Hotel/Restaurant, Well Irish Pub and Zaika Lounge, the latter located at Rupas Mall.

Points of interest

Champions Monument

The Champions Monument is situated at the junction of Kaptagat and Nairobi roads and was erected in honour of retired, elite and upcoming athletes in the country. The bronze monument, erected by Mediheal Group of Hospitals, depicts two female athletes and two male athletes attached on a world map running towards different directions. One of the males is holding an Olympic torch in one hand while the rest have their hands raised up as a sign of victory. It also has an image of a male athlete mounted on the top draped in the Kenyan flag.

Chepkiit Waterfalls
Located in Nand County, the name loosely translates to "view from above" and it features four viewpoints which are favorite locations for picnics and bird-seeing excursions. In the past, the location was a site of the ancient practice of Sheu Morobi where very old members of the Nandi community would jump to their deaths for a variety of reasons including loneliness and so as not to burden the community.

Wagon Hotel
The Wagon hotel is a local institution dating to the Afrikaner period in Eldoret. The majority of Afrikaners who settled in Kenya made their home in Uasin Gishu, turning what was for many centuries prime pasture land into one Kenya's most productive agricultural zones.  They made their way to Uasin Gishu in wagons and the hotel bears testament to the 'trek' made by those families as they sought a new home and as they built one. The hotel itself, was built in 1926 by these families as a recreational hub and is one of the oldest buildings in town. It has pictures of the wagons of the Great Treks — as the journeys from South Africa to Kenya were known then, and a dining area shaped like an elongated railway wagon with a looped roof. It also features a modern casino, the only one in the North Rift region.

Iten Viewpoint
Situated north-east of Eldoret at the high altitude of 2,400 m above sea level, the small town of Iten is known for its regional honey, being home to training camps for international athletes and the unparalleled viewpoints of the Great Rift Valley. The viewpoint offers spectacular views of natural landmarks such as Kerio valley, Lake Kamnarok, Kerio River with its crocodiles, Tugen Hills and Cherangani Hills. Iten viewpoint allows you to see more of the Great Rift Valley than any other place in Africa.

Eldoret Daima Plaza
It was built by the Moi University Pension Scheme and was opened in 2016.

Eldoret Club
Eldoret Club is a private members club that was established in 1924 on the edge of town. It is situated on large well-manicured grounds that house a clubhouse, a 9-hole golf course and a variety of other facilities.

Athletics Training Centres
Athletics is by far the most popular sport in the region with wins at the Olympics and World Athletics Championships as well as road races across the world having propelled many local residents to stardom and financial success. Current and future athletes can be seen training at the IAAF High Altitude Training Center and other privately run training centers, the Kipchoge Keino stadium or even along the streets on most mornings.

Poa Place
This is a notable resort in the town and features a wide variety of accommodation, food and amusements.

Education

Eldoret is home to Moi University. These campuses are;Annex Campus (School of Law), Town Campus( School of Medicine and School of dental sciences), Rivatex Campus (School of aeronautical engineering) and Eldoret West campus (for privately sponsored students) a student population of 14,855 as of 2006.

The University of Eldoret is the second largest university in the city having been awarded its charter in 2013. Its main campus is located within the city limits to the north of the town.

Other universities with campuses in the town include Catholic University of East Africa, Jomo Kenyatta University, University of Nairobi, University of East Africa - Baraton, Kabarak University, Mount Kenya University and Kisii University

The city also is home to many technical and vocational institutes including Rift Valley Technical Training Institute, Eldoret National Polytechnic, African Institute for Research and Applied Studies.

Health
There are a number of medical facilities in the city, notably Moi Teaching & Referral Hospital; The only referral national hospital in western Kenya.  The county has the Uasin Gishu District Hospital, and there are several private institutions: St. Luke Orthopaedic And Trauma Hospital, Eldoret Hospital, Mediheal Hospital, Eldoret Oncology Associates Cancer Hospital, Reale Hospital, Alexandria Cancer Centre and Palliative Care Hospital and Elgon View Hospital among others.

In 2015, East & Central Africa's first public children's hospital, The Shoe4Africa Children's Hospital, a 200-bed general teaching hospital, was opened, behind the Moi Referral.

Also in 2015, a new out patient cancer treatment centre was opened at the Moi Teaching and Referral Hospital, funded principally by Ruth Lily, an American philanthropist. It has been named after the businessman, Manu Chandaria, a later funder, and is now known as The Chandaria Cancer and Chronic Disease Centre.

Sport
Eldoret, in particular the Elgon View area, is the hometown of numerous Kenyan runners, the most renowned of whom are Kipchoge Keino and Eliud Kipchoge. The high altitude is an ideal training ground for many middle and long distance athletes. 

Kipchoge Keino Stadium is the town's main stadium and is a multi-use stadium with a capacity of 10,000 people. The stadium is used for athletic meetings and hosts local football teams including Rivatex and Eldoret KCC. The stadium fell into disrepair and was refurbished beginning in 2007 when the Kenyan Government allocated Ksh100 million for its upgrade. It is currently (2018) undergoing a major expansion and renovation.

Eldoret Falcons is a women's football team that represents the city in the nationwide league while Eldoret RFC is a men's rugby team in the nationwide league. The city has also been a popular stage in the KCB Safari Rally.

The city is home to the Eldoret City Marathon, whose $35,000 winners purse during its second edition in 2019 made it the richest marathon race in Africa. The event is organised by the Uasin Gishu county government and is patronized by the County Governor, H.E Jackson Mandago and Moses Tanui.

The city is also host to a leg of the annual national sevens circuit rugby tournament being one of the six cities that make up the circuit. The Eldoret leg is played in June and referred to as the Sepetuka Sevens. It is extremely popular and brings the city to a halt for the entire weekend with fans coming into the city from all over the country.

Eldoret is also home to the International Association of Athletics Federations (IAAF)'s High Altitude Training Centre for Kenyan and international athletes.

Eldoret Club, a golf club is located a short distance from its CBD.

Infrastructure

Transport

Airports

The City of Eldoret is served by two aerodromes, Eldoret International Airport and Eldoret Airstrip.

It has daily scheduled flights to Nairobi and Lodwar and weekly international cargo flights operated by Emirates and Etihad Airways.

Four domestic airline companies operate in this airport: Fly 540, Jambojet, Skyward Express and Silverstone Air.

The Eldoret Airstrip, also known as the Eldoret Boma Airport, is a small airstrip located within Eldoret city on the Eldoret Iten road. The county government of Uasin Gishu took over operations of the Eldoret airstrip in July 2015

Roads

The Trans-African highway passes through the city central business district.

Railway
The city is also served by the Kenya-Uganda railway.

Power
The French renewable energy firm Voltalia is building a 40-megawatt (MW) solar plant for compatriot Kenya-based French solar firm Alten Africa in Kesses, Eldoret. Once it goes into commercial operation, scheduled for March 2020, approximately 123.6GWh of clean electricity will be injected into the grid every year, enough to meet the annual energy consumption needs of over 824,000 Kenyans.

Oil pipelines
The Kenya Pipeline Company operates a pipeline that passes through the city. It is connected to the refinery at the coastal city of Mombasa and extends further from Eldoret to the lakeside city of Kisumu. One of 5 national oil depots is located in the city.

Sister cities
Eldoret is a sister city of:

References

External links

 
Populated places in Uasin Gishu County
Cities in the Great Rift Valley
Populated places founded by Afrikaners
County capitals in Kenya